The following is a summary of Derry county football team's 2008 season. Details of the 2008 Derry club competitions are also shown.

Dr McKenna Cup

Derry had a relatively successful 2008 Dr McKenna Cup, winning all three groups games and reaching the final, before losing to Down. Manager Paddy Crozier used the competition to try out young promising players, such as Enda Lynn, who won the TG4 Man of the Match award against Armagh on his inter-county debut. Paddy Bradley ended the competition as Derry's top scorer with 2-15.

Group games

Semi-final

Final

National Football League
Derry won the 2008 National League, their first League success since 1999/2000 and sixth in total. They finished top of the group stage standings and along with Kerry qualified for the final, played in Parnell Park. Derry defeated Kerry on a scoreline of 2-13 to 2-09, with Fergal Doherty grabbing the man of the match award. As in the McKenna Cup, Paddy Bradley ended the competition as Derry's top scorer with 1-39 (42). Indeed, this was third overall in Division 1, behind Kerry's Bryan Sheehan (1-41 (44)) and Galway's Michael Meehan (4-31 (43)).

Group games

Final

Championship
Derry Championship line-ups:

Ulster Senior Football Championship

Qualifiers

Squad statistics

As of Qualifiers Round 1 played 19 July 2008 against Monaghan

Notes:
Apps stats are recorded as (Starts) (Substitute appearances), i.e. (2)(3) indicates a player started two games and came on as a substitute in a further three games.
Ryan Dillon (QUB), Mark Lynch (UUJ), Barry McGoldrick and Michael McIver (both St. Mary's) all represented their college sides during the McKenna Cup, as they have first choice over players for the competition.
Joe O'Kane, Shane McGuckin and Enda Lynn were called up to the Championship panel ahead of the Fermanagh game.
Christopher McKaigue and Dermot McBride were called up to the panel ahead of the Monaghan game.

Club scene
Main source:

Adult championships

Adult regional competitions

Adult leagues

Underage championships

Underage leagues

Other underage competitions

Notes and references

External links
Derry GAA official website
Senior County Football 2008 on Derry GAA official website

Season Derry
Gaelic
Derry county football team seasons